Japanese in the United Kingdom include   or permanent residents of Japanese birth or citizenship, as well as expatriate business professionals and their dependents on limited-term employment visas, students, trainees and young people participating in the UK government-sponsored Youth Mobility Scheme.

Background

History and settlement
Settlement first began in the late 19th century with the arrival of Japanese professionals, students and their servants. 264 citizens of Japan resided in Britain in 1884, the majority of whom identifying as officials and students. Employment diversified in the early 1900s with the growth of the Japanese community, which exceeded five hundred people by the close of the first decade of the 20th century.

As tensions escalated between Japan and the United Kingdom in the buildup to World War II, some Japanese left their home country to settle in Britain while many more returned to Japan. Following the Japanese attack on Pearl Harbor and assault on Hong Kong in December 1941, 114 Japanese men including expatriate businessmen and merchant seamen were detained as enemy aliens on the Isle of Man.

In the post-war era, new waves of immigration emerged in the 1960s, mainly for business and economic purposes. In recent decades this number has grown; including immigrants, students, and businessmen. In 2014 the Japanese Ministry of Foreign Affairs estimated that there were 67,258 Japanese nationals resident in the United Kingdom For British nationals of Japanese heritage, unlike other Nikkei communities elsewhere in the world, these Britons do not conventionally parse their communities in generational terms as Issei, Nisei, or Sansei.

Students
The first Japanese students in the United Kingdom arrived in the nineteenth century, sent to study at University College London by the Chōshū and Satsuma domains, then the Bakufu (Shogunate). Later many studied at Cambridge University and a smaller number at Oxford University until the end of the Meiji era. The reason for sending them was to catch up with the West by modernizing Japan. Since the 1980s, Japanese students in the United Kingdom have become common thanks to cheaper air travel.

Demographics

Parts of the United Kingdom, in particular London, have significant Japanese populations, such as Golders Green and East Finchley in North London. Derbyshire has a significant Japanese population due to its Toyota plant, and is twinned with Toyota, Aichi. Similarly Telford is home to numerous Japanese firms.

According to the 2001 UK Census, 37,535 Japanese born people were residing in the UK, whilst the Japanese Ministry of Foreign Affairs estimates that 50,864 Japanese nationals were calling the UK home in 2002. In the 2011 Census, 35,313 people in England specified their country of birth as Japan, 601 in Wales, 1,273 in Scotland and 144 in Northern Ireland. 35,043 people living in England and Wales chose to write in Japanese in response to the ethnicity question, 1,245 in Scotland, and 90 in Northern Ireland. The Office for National Statistics estimates that, in 2015, 43,000 people born in Japan were resident in the UK.

Japanese is the primary language of Japan, and the 2011 Census found that 27,764 people in England and Wales spoke Japanese as their main language, 27,305 of them in England alone, and 17,050 in London alone. The 2011 Census also found that 83 people in Northern Ireland spoke Japanese as their main language.

Organisations
The Japan Society and Japan Foundation support cultural programmes about Japanese culture.

Notable individuals
Below is a list of notable British people of Japanese heritage. Temporary individuals and expatriates are not included and can be found at Category:Japanese expatriates in the United Kingdom.

British citizens born in the UK of Japanese ancestry
 Andrew Koji – actor and martial artist of mixed English and Japanese ancestry, known for The Innocents and Warrior
 China Chow – actress, of mixed European and East Asian ancestry
 Esprit D'Air – rock band with various musicians of Japanese ancestry
 Jasmine Rodgers - lead singer of English alternative rock band Bôa
 MiChi (Michiko Sellars) – dance-pop singer in Japan
 Miki Berenyi – singer, of mixed Hungarian and Japanese ancestry
 Simon Fujiwara - artist
 Steve Rodgers - guitarist of English alternative rock band Bôa
 Will Sharpe – actor of mixed English and Japanese

Japanese residents in the United Kingdom
 Kae Alexander - actress
 Haruka Abe - actress
 Sarah Bonito – lead singer of South London band Kero Kero Bonito
 Taka Hirose – bassist, of the band Feeder
 Togo Igawa – actor
 Sir Kazuo Ishiguro – novelist, 2017 Nobel Prize in Literature winner
 Haruka Kuroda – actress
 Akiko Matsuura - drummer, lead singer of the band Pre
 Eleanor Matsuura – actress
 Matt McCooey – actor
 Kaoru Mfaume – entertainment producer
 Naoko Mori – actress
 Sonoya Mizuno – actress, known for Ex Machina and La La Land
 Rina Sawayama – singer-songwriter and model
 Takehiro Tomiyasu - footballer
 Dame Mitsuko Uchida – pianist
 Hikaru Utada - musician
 Diana Yukawa – violinist
 Asami Zdrenka – former member of British girlband Neon Jungle

Other
 Jun Tanaka – TV chef of Channel 4's Cooking It
 Scott MacKenzie, darts player, born in Brazil to mixed Japanese and Scottish parentage
 Yoko Ono – artist

Education

Primary and secondary schools

Many state and independent schools in the United Kingdom serve Japanese children. As of 2013, about 10-20% of Japanese school-age residents in the United Kingdom attend full-time Japanese curriculum-based international schools. These schools include the Japanese School in London, and the boarding schools Rikkyo School in England and Teikyo School United Kingdom.

The Shi-Tennoji School in Suffolk was in operation from 1985 to its date of closing, 17 July 2000. The Gyosei International School UK in Milton Keynes closed in 2002, after 15 years of operation.

Post-secondary education

The Teikyo school maintains Teikyo University of Japan in Durham at the Lafcadio Hearn Cultural Centre at the University of Durham.

A boarding college in Winchester, Hampshire, the Winchester Shoei College at the University of Winchester (formerly Shoei Centre at King Alfred's College), is an affiliate of the Shoei Gakuin. It opened in 1982.

Gyosei International College in the U.K. opened in 1989 in Reading, Berkshire on land formerly controlled by the University of Reading and its name later changed to the Witan International College. In 2004 the University of Reading announced that it took control of the Witan college.

Supplementary education

The Ministry of Education, Culture, Sports, Science and Technology (MEXT) has eight Saturday Japanese supplementary schools in operation. As of 2013, 2,392 Japanese children in Canterbury, Cardiff, Derby, Edinburgh (school is in Livingston), Leeds, London, Manchester (school is in Lymm), Sunderland (school is in Oxclose), and Telford attend these schools.
  - Morley, Erewash, Derbyshire
 Japanese Saturday School in London
  - Cardiff
  - Located in Canterbury - Its time of establishment is August 2005
  - Lymm, Warrington, Cheshire
  - Oxclose, Tyne and Wear (near Newcastle-upon-Tyne)
  - Livingston (near Edinburgh), established in 1982
  - Stirchley, Telford
  — Leeds

See also

 British East and Southeast Asian
 Britons in Japan
 Japanese diaspora
 Japan–United Kingdom relations
 Japan Society of the UK
 Japanese students in the United Kingdom
 Japan–British Exhibition
 Japanese community of London

Notes

References
 

External links
 
 
 Reassessing what we collect website - Japanese London History of Japanese London with objects and images
 

 
United Kingdom
 
 
Immigration to the United Kingdom by country of origin